Dren may refer to:

People
 Dren (name), an Albanian given name

Places
 Dren, Pernik Province, a village in Pernik Province of Bulgaria
 Dren, Leposavić, a village in Kosovo
 Dren, Zubin Potok, a village in Kosovo
 Dren, Demir Kapija, a village in North Macedonia
 Dren, Prilep, a village in North Macedonia
 Dren (mountain), in the village
 Dren (Lazarevac), a village in Serbia
 Dren (Obrenovac), a village in Serbia
 Dren, Kostel, a settlement in Slovenia

Other uses
 DREN, a United States Department of Defense computer network
 "dren", fictional profanity from the science fiction TV series Farscape, see profanity in science fiction